The Destiny of Zorro is a video game about Zorro, developed by American studio Pronto Games for the Wii.

Gameplay
The game is a traditional third-person action game, with cut-to sections where the player uses the Wii Remote to execute certain moves.  For instance, the Wii Remote's pointer is used to trace out Zorro's iconic slash marks to defeat enemies whenever certain conditions are fulfilled, or control Zorro's whip, where the player points at a potential snaring target or grappling point and presses the A Button to launch the whip, allowing Zorro to swing over gaps or pull down objects.  Controller gestures are used in combat, where the Wii Remote is used for basic sword moves and the Nunchuk is used for dodging enemy attacks.

Setting and music
This game takes place in the coast and desert landscape of Spanish California in the early 19th century, as the player takes the role of the hero Zorro. The game is officially described to have drawn "inspiration from the Mexican, Spanish and Native Southwest American cultures prevalent in California in the early 1800s", giving the player a number of plots to play through, such as taking on Calavera and his troops or a power-hungry mob boss, thwarting a plot to steal a great treasure, and facing off against a rebel army.  The game's soundtrack, composed by Andrew Edlen of Harmonic Engineering, takes its inspiration from classical Spanish culture, consistent with the game's setting.

Companion game

Many months after Destinys release, 505 Games later released Zorro: Quest for Justice''' for the Nintendo DS.  It shares the same box art as Destiny'', but features a significantly different plot and a different combat system, in which Zorro can only fight one enemy at a time and fighting is done with buttons, as opposed to motion controls.

See also
Zorro
List of Wii games

References

External links
Announcement on the official website
The Destiny of Zorro on GameSpot
The Destiny of Zorro on IGN
The Destiny of Zorro on Cubed3

505 Games games
2008 video games
Wii-only games
Video games based on Zorro
Video games developed in the United States
Video games set in the 19th century
Wii games
Video games set in California
Pronto Games games